Tredje gången gillt is a song written by Lasse Westmann, Lennart Sjöholm and Jacob Dahlin, and originally performed by Christer Sjögren, Annika Hagström and Jacob Dahlin. The song was also included on Vikingarna's 1988 album "Kramgoa låtar 16".

The song charted at Svensktoppen for nine weeks during the period of 8 May-11 September, peaking at second position.

The song has also been recorded by Canyons orkester and Kjelleriks, on the album 88 1988  respective Dansvänliga låtar 2 1989.

Jontez recorded the song on 2008 album Om du vill så ska jag gå.

References

1988 singles
Swedish-language songs
Vikingarna (band) songs
1988 songs